The Twelfth Juror is a 1913 American drama film. The silent film, directed by George Lessey, features an early appearance of Harold Lloyd in an uncredited role.

Cast
 Ben F. Wilson as Harry Baker
 Laura Sawyer as Alice Charlton
 Jack Conway as Clarence Morton
 R. Henry Grey as Jeff Robey (as Robert Grey)
 Harold Lloyd as Boy at Barn Dance (uncredited)

See also
 Harold Lloyd filmography

References

External links

1913 films
American silent short films
1913 drama films
1913 short films
American black-and-white films
Films directed by George Lessey
Silent American drama films
1910s American films
1910s English-language films